Danilia galeata is a species of sea snail, a marine gastropod mollusk in the family Chilodontidae.

Description

Distribution
This species occurs in the Western Pacific.

References

 Vilvens C. & Héros V. 2005. New species and new records of Danilia (Gastropoda: Chilodontidae) from the Western Pacific. Novapex 6(3) : 53–64

External links
 

galeata
Gastropods described in 2005